The yellow-breasted boubou (Laniarius atroflavus) is a species of bird in the family Malaconotidae.

Ecology and distribution

It is found in the Cameroonian Highlands forests on Mt. Cameroon and the adjacent Cameroon highlands. 

Its natural habitats are subtropical or tropical moist montane forests, subtropical or tropical moist shrubland, and subtropical or tropical high-altitude shrubland.
The species is monotypic and sedentary.

Behaviour

Breeding
November marks the start of the breeding season, which is typically ends in late March. Two eggs are present in the clutch.

References

yellow-breasted boubou
Birds of Central Africa
yellow-breasted boubou
Taxonomy articles created by Polbot